Liberty Township is one of the twenty-four townships of Trumbull County, Ohio, United States.  The 2010 census found 21,982 people within the geographical area of the township, 12,034 of whom lived in the unincorporated portions of the township. A suburb directly north of Youngstown, it is part of the Youngstown–Warren metropolitan area.

History 

It is one of twenty-five Liberty Townships statewide.

Liberty Township was formed from the Connecticut Western Reserve.  It was established as a township in 1806.  The first settler in the township was thought to be Henry Swager in 1798.  Four villages grew within its borders: Girard, Churchill, Sodom, and Seceders Corners.  In 1860, coal was discovered on Alexander McCleery's farm becoming a major industry in the area for the next forty years.

Geography 
Located at  (41.156944, -80.677778) in the southeastern part of Trumbull County, Liberty Township borders the following townships, city, and village:
Vienna Township, Trumbull County on the north
Brookfield Township, Trumbull County on the northeast corner
Hubbard Township, Trumbull County on the east
Youngstown on the south
Austintown Township, Mahoning County on the southwest corner
Weathersfield Township, Trumbull County on the west
Howland Township, Trumbull County on the northwest corner
McDonald on the west

Liberty Township is one of two urban townships in Trumbull County, along with Howland Township.  It is located on the southern edge of the county.

Most of the city of Girard is located in western Liberty Township, and the census-designated place of Churchill is located in the township's center.

Demographics
According to the 2010 Census numbers, Liberty Township (the unincorporated areas, excluding the city of Girard) had 5,029 households and 3,337 families.

The racial makeup of the unincorporated areas of the township was roughly 78.4% White, 17.7% Black or African American, 1.0% Asian, 0.26% American Indian or Alaska Native, 2.2% of two or more races. 2.2% identify themselves as Hispanic or Latino of any race.

Records suggest that in the township (excluding Girard), 26.1% of the households had children under the age of 18. Of households with children under the age of 18, 59.8% were married couples living together, 30.1% had a female householder with no husband present, and 2.1% were non-families. Meanwhile, 28.1% of all households comprise a single person, and 12.3% of households comprised a person over 65 years of age living alone. For every 100 females, there were 92.7 males. The median age was 46 years. The average household size was 2.35 and the average family size was 2.86.

Government 
The township is governed by a three-member board of trustees, who are elected in November of odd-numbered years to a four-year term beginning on the following January 1. Two are elected in the year after the presidential election and one is elected in the year before it. There is also an elected township fiscal officer, who serves a four-year term beginning on April 1 of the year after the election, which is held in November of the year before the presidential election. Vacancies in the fiscal officership or on the board of trustees are filled by the remaining trustees.

Education 
Public education in the township (excluding the city of Girard) is managed by the Liberty Local School District. The school district mascot is the leopard.  The Liberty Township school district comprises three schools:
E. J. Blott Elementary School
William S. Guy Middle School
Liberty High School
Average district daily enrollment during the 2010–2011 school year was 1427 pupils. 59.2% of pupils were white (non-Hispanic), 31.7% were black (non-Hispanic), 2.9% were Hispanic, and 5.3% were multiracial. 60.2% of pupils come from economically disadvantaged households. 12.2% of pupils were students with disabilities.

Transportation 
State Route 193 is a significant transportation artery in Liberty Township.

The Liberty Township Police Department actively enforces speed limits on the portion of Interstate 80 and State Route 11 using Lidar devices. This is an effort to slow down drivers and to save lives. These tickets are revenue based, and have no standing against one's driving record. Many citations go unpaid because of this.

Notable people 
Marc Dann, former attorney general of Ohio
Jerry DePizzo, saxophonist and guitaristist
Bob DiPiero, songwriter
John Q. Emery, Wisconsin Superintendent of Public Instruction
Dave Malkoff, National Correspondent for The Weather Channel
David C. Smith (author), author of fantasy, horror, and suspense fiction, medical editor, and essayist

See also 
Youngstown, Ohio is the main metropolitan area bordering Liberty Township.

References

External links 
Township website
County website
School district website

Townships in Trumbull County, Ohio
1806 establishments in Ohio
Townships in Ohio